Maya Celeste Laylor (born July 4, 1995) is a Canadian weightlifter from Toronto, Ontario. She won the gold medal in the women's 76 kg event at the 2022 Commonwealth Games held in Birmingham, England.

Career

Junior
Laylor competed at two World Juniors Weightlifting Championships, finishing with a no mark in 2014 and 5th in 2015, both in the 69 kg event.

Senior
Laylor is a two time Commonwealth Weightlifting Championships champion.

In March 2022, Laylor was officially named to Canada's 2022 Commonwealth Games team. Laylor would go onto win the gold medal in the 76 kg event at the games.

References

External links 

1995 births
Living people
Canadian female weightlifters
Sportspeople from Toronto
Weightlifters at the 2022 Commonwealth Games
Commonwealth Games medallists in weightlifting
Commonwealth Games gold medallists for Canada
21st-century Canadian women
Medallists at the 2022 Commonwealth Games